The Black Rider is the twelfth studio album by Tom Waits, released in 1993 on Island Records, featuring studio versions of songs Waits wrote for the play The Black Rider, directed by Robert Wilson and co-written by William S. Burroughs. The play is based on the German folktale Der Freischütz by Johann August Apel, which had previously been made into an opera  by Carl Maria von Weber. The play premiered on March 31, 1990, at the Thalia Theater in Hamburg, Germany. Its world English-language premiere occurred in 1998 at the Edmonton International Fringe Festival.

Waits would later collaborate with Wilson on the plays Alice (1992) and Woyzeck (2000), the music to which were released on the albums Alice and Blood Money, respectively.

Track listing
All songs written by Tom Waits, except where noted. Recorded in 1989 by Gerd Bessler at his Music Factory in Hamburg, Germany (2, 3, 6–9, 14–16, 19, 20), and in 1993 by Tchad Blake and assisted by Joe Marquez  at the Prairie Sun Recording Studios in Cotati, California (1, 4, 5, 10–13, 17, 18). Musical Director Greg Cohen. All songs mixed by Biff Dawes At Sunset Sound Factory, Hollywood, CA.

 "Lucky Day Overture" – 2:27
 "The Black Rider" – 3:21
 "November" – 2:53
 "Just the Right Bullets" – 3:35
 "Black Box Theme" (instrumental) – 2:42
 "'T' Ain't No Sin" (Walter Donaldson, Edgar Leslie) – 2:25
 "Flash Pan Hunter/Intro" (instrumental) – 1:10
 "That's the Way" (music: Waits; lyrics: William S. Burroughs) – 1:07
 "The Briar and the Rose" – 3:50
 "Russian Dance" (instrumental) – 3:12
 "Gospel Train/Orchestra" (instrumental) – 2:33
 "I'll Shoot the Moon" – 3:51
 "Flash Pan Hunter" (music: Waits; lyrics: William S. Burroughs) – 3:10
 "Crossroads" (music: Waits; lyrics: William S. Burroughs) – 2:43
 "Gospel Train" - 4:43
 "Interlude" (Greg Cohen) (instrumental) – 0:18
 "Oily Night" - 4:23
 "Lucky Day" – 3:42
 "The Last Rose of Summer" – 2:07
 "Carnival" (instrumental) - 1:15

Hans-Jörn Brandenburg, Volker Hemken, Henning Stoll, Christoph Moinian, Dieter Fischer, Jo Bauer, Frank Wulff, and Stefan Schäfer were The Devil's Rhubato Band (Hamburg); Ralph Carney, Bill Douglas, Kenny Wollesen, Matt Brubeck, Joe Gore, Nick Phelps, Kevin Porter, Lawrence "Larry" Rhodes, Francis Thumm, Don Neely, Linda Deluca were The Rhubato West Group (San Francisco).

Songs performed in the play, but not included on the album: "Chase the Clouds Away" and "In the Morning".

References

1993 soundtrack albums
Theatre soundtracks
Tom Waits soundtracks
Island Records soundtracks
William S. Burroughs

tr:The Black Rider (oyun)